Albert Danquah Adomah (born 13 December 1987) is a professional footballer who plays as a right winger for EFL Championship club Queens Park Rangers. Born in England, he represented the Ghana national team.

He is both a Ghanaian and a British national. His previous clubs are Harrow Borough, Barnet, Bristol City, Middlesbrough, Aston Villa and Nottingham Forest.

Club career

Harrow Borough
After a spell at Chiswick-based amateur side Old Meadonians as a teenager, Adomah began his career playing semi-professional football with Isthmian League Premier Division club Harrow Borough, while studying Level 2 Decorative Finishing and Industrial Painting at the College of North West London.

Barnet
In January 2008, Adomah joined League Two side Barnet. Barnet agreed to play Harrow in a pre-season friendly.

He scored on his Football League debut for Barnet in a 2–1 win over Hereford United at Edgar Street on 30 January 2008. In March, he scored two first half goals in a 4–1 win over Shrewsbury Town and scored in two successive games, against Chester City and Lincoln City. He made a total of 22 league appearances in the 2007–08 season, scoring five goals and helping Barnet to a 12th-place finish in League Two. Albert was voted Barnet FC Young Player of the Year 2008-9 by the Barnet Football Club Supporters association.

In July 2009, Adomah was linked with a transfer to Championship side Blackpool. On the final day of the transfer window, Barnet chairman Tony Kleanthous revealed that talks with Blackpool broke down two hours before the deadline and that he had also turned down offers from Norwich City and Watford. It was later reported that Adomah could still move to Blackpool on loan, with a view to a permanent move in January 2010.

On 6 October 2009, it was announced that football commentator John Motson had sponsored Adomah at Barnet.

On 12 November 2009, Adomah turned down Barnet's offer of a new contract. His agent, Tony Finnigan, confirmed that Adomah wanted to leave, saying, "Barnet made an excellent offer...but he deserves a run at a higher level." Tony Kleanthous said that he would not stand in Adomah's way if they received an acceptable offer. On 13 May 2010, Barnet made a bid to keep Adomah at the club by offering a twenty-percent increase on their original contract offer, which would have made him the highest paid player in the club's history, but on 28 May it was confirmed that Adomah would not be signing a new contract. He had played 120 games for Barnet scoring 20 times.

Bristol City
On 1 July 2010, he agreed to join Bristol City on a three-year deal, with an initial fee of £150,000 being set later by a tribunal. Adomah scored his first Bristol City goal on 13 July, in a friendly against Swedish club IFK Gothenburg. After impressing in pre-season, Steve Coppell named Adomah in the starting line-up for City's first game of the season at home to Millwall, a game which they lost 3–0. He continued to put in good performances in the domestic league, and instantly became a fans' favourite through his exciting style of play and his humorous interviews on the club website. He scored his first goal for City during a 3–3 draw with Barnsley at Ashton Gate. After a few below-par performances, Adomah was taken off at half time during City's 0–4 win away at Preston North End, and reaped the rewards as his side then went on a winning run with Adomah being instrumental on his return to the side. He scored his fourth goal of the season in a 2–1 win against in form Portsmouth, and ended the season top of the club's assists chart with 12 to his name in all competitions.

Adomah was awarded the player of the season award for Bristol City for the 2010–11 campaign, days after agreeing a new three-year contract which would keep him at the club until 2014.

The 25-year-old Ghana international had made it clear to City that he did not wish to play in League One following their relegation from the Championship, following this, Wigan Athletic made two bids for the winger, both of which were rejected; Adomah submitted a transfer request which was refused.

The start of the 2013 season saw Adomah rested for Bristol City's campaign opener.

Middlesbrough
On 6 August 2013, Adomah was announced to be having a medical at Middlesbrough's Rockliffe Park training ground. On 8 August 2013 Adomah completed his move to Middlesbrough for an undisclosed fee believed to be in the region of £1,000,000.

He was issued the number twenty-seven squad number worn last season by striker Scott McDonald who signed for Millwall. Adomah made his debut for Boro in their 1–0 victory over Charlton Athletic on 10 August 2013.

Adomah scored his first goal for the club on 14 September 2013 in a 3–1 loss to Ipswich Town. He scored again on 5 October 2013 in a 4–1 home win over Yeovil Town and twice more on 19 October 2013 in a 3–2 defeat at Barnsley. A week after grabbing a brace against Barnsley, Adomah once again scored twice in a 4–0 victory over Doncaster Rovers. Adomah was nominated for the Championship's Player of the Month for October after several impressive performances and scoring 5 goals in 4 games.

Adomah reached the play-off final after a 5–1 aggregate win over Brentford, including Adomah scoring in the semi final but they lost the decisive match 0–2 to Norwich City at Wembley Stadium in the Final. The following season, Adomah earned promotion as Middlesbrough finished runners-up in the EFL Championship. He played 2 games for Middlesbrough in the Premier League during the beginning of August 2016 prior to his move to Villa.

Aston Villa
Adomah signed for Aston Villa on transfer deadline day for an undisclosed fee, swapping directions with Adama Traoré who went the other way, 31 August 2016. He scored his first goal for Aston Villa in a 3–1 win against Cardiff City on 26 November 2016. He scored two goals in a 2–2 draw at home against Preston North End. He enjoyed a good run of form as he was among the second best in terms of assists within the championship assisting 11 goals compared to Conor Hourihane's 14 assists in the 2016–17 EFL Championship season.

During the 2017–18 Aston Villa F.C. season Adomah scored 15 goals, finishing the club's top scorer, to help Villa secure a play-off place and defeat his old side Middlesbrough in the two semi finals to reach the final, playing in the final, as Villa lost 1–0 to Fulham in the final and thus missed out on promotion to the Premier League.

He was released by Aston Villa at the end of the 2018–19 season.

Nottingham Forest
On 10 July 2019, Adomah signed a two-year deal with Nottingham Forest. He scored his first goal for Forest in a 1–1 draw with Charlton Athletic on 21 August 2019.

On 2 October 2020, Adomah and Forest mutually agreed to terminate his contract with the club.

Cardiff City (loan)
Adomah joined Cardiff City on a six-month loan deal on 31 January 2020.

Queens Park Rangers
On 5 October 2020, following his departure from Nottingham Forest, Adomah signed for boyhood club Queens Park Rangers on a two-year deal. He scored his first goal for QPR, a late winner, in a 2–1 win over Watford on 1 February 2021.

On 15 January 2022, Adomah played the duration of his QPR's 1–0 top-of-the-table victory against West Bromwich Albion, his 456th appearance in the second tier, making him the record appearance holder in Championship history.

International career
Adomah made his international debut when coming on as a substitute for Ghana in their 1–0 defeat against Brazil on 5 September 2011 at Craven Cottage. He broke through the national team to book his place in Ghana's provisional 26-man squad for the 2013 African Cup of Nations. On 9 January, Adomah made the starting team, was given the number 10 shirt and was told he would play a big role for the national team. He was selected and went to 2014 FIFA World Cup in Brazil where he played in one game for Ghana.

Career statistics

Club

International

Honours
Middlesbrough
 EFL Championship runner-up: 2015–16

Aston Villa
 EFL Championship play-offs: 2019

Individual
 Barnet FC Young Player of the Year: 2008–09
 Bristol City Player of the Year: 2010–11

References

External links

1987 births
Living people
Footballers from Lambeth
English footballers
English sportspeople of Ghanaian descent
Citizens of Ghana through descent
Ghanaian footballers
Ghana international footballers
Association football wingers
Harrow Borough F.C. players
Barnet F.C. players
Bristol City F.C. players
Middlesbrough F.C. players
Aston Villa F.C. players
Nottingham Forest F.C. players
Cardiff City F.C. players
Queens Park Rangers F.C. players
Isthmian League players
Premier League players
English Football League players
2013 Africa Cup of Nations players
2014 FIFA World Cup players
Black British sportsmen